Richard Trevor may refer to:
 Richard Trevor (bishop) (1707–1771), Bishop of St David's, Bishop of Durham
 Sir Richard Trevor (politician) (1558–1638), Welsh landowner, soldier and politician